Les Châteliers is a commune in the Deux-Sèvres department in the Nouvelle-Aquitaine region in western France. It was established on 1 January 2019 by merger of the former communes of Coutières (the seat) and Chantecorps.

See also
Communes of the Deux-Sèvres department

References

Communes of Deux-Sèvres
Populated places established in 2019
2019 establishments in France